Osceola Public School Building, also known as Osceola High School Building, is a historic school building located at Osceola, St. Clair County, Missouri. The original section was built in 1914–1915, and is a three-story, brick and cut stone building. It features a segmental
arched, recessed main entrance, located in a projecting centered bay. A two-story brick and cut stone addition designed by architect Charles A. Smith was added in 1937.

It was added to the National Register of Historic Places in 1999.

References

High schools in Missouri
School buildings on the National Register of Historic Places in Missouri
School buildings completed in 1915
Buildings and structures in St. Clair County, Missouri
National Register of Historic Places in St. Clair County, Missouri
1915 establishments in Missouri